Joe Duttine, sometimes credited as Jo Duttine (born 30 June 1970), is an English film, theatre and television actor. He currently plays Tim Metcalfe in Coronation Street. He is also known for his role in Shameless as Cameron Donnelly, the father of Maxine.

Early life
Duttine was born in Shelf, Halifax, West Riding of Yorkshire, England. His father, Geoffrey, is the brother of actor John Duttine. Joe moved to London and attended the Drama Centre London since 1999. He also attended Central Saint Martins College of Art and Design of the University of the Arts London where he studied Stanislavski's system of method acting alongside actors Craig Kelly and John Simm.

Career
Duttine made his television debut in 1992 appearing in the television series Between the Lines. Duttine has appeared in over 25 television roles including the television series Pie in the Sky, as Steve Turner in 21 episodes, (1994–1995); opposite Martin Kemp in the series Serious and Organised, appearing as D.C. Tony Finn; appearing as Craig Tate in Blood Sweat, and Tears; Life on Mars, as Malcolm Cox in one episode (2006); and HolbyBlue, as Toby Wilson in one episode (2008). He played DS Carr in Coronation Street, and miner Colin Farr in "UnderWorld" episode of Dalziel and Pascoe. He has also made appearances in Waterloo Road as Andy Harker,  and Shameless as Cameron Donnelly. In 2013 he reappeared in Coronation Street as Tim Metcalfe, the father of Faye Windass, and was cast as Rutter in the major BBC series The Village. He is also known for his collaborations with BAFTA award nominated actor John Simm, whom he met at drama school. They have appeared together in television shows such as Life on Mars, The Village and Scott and Bailey.

He has also appeared in several films such as the 2001 comedy-drama The Navigators, playing the role of Paul.

He also appeared as narrator of Channel 5 series On Benefits, a documentary series about people living on welfare.

Filmography

References

External links

1970 births
20th-century English male actors
21st-century English male actors
Actors from Halifax, West Yorkshire
Alumni of the Drama Centre London
English male film actors
English male television actors
Living people
Male actors from Yorkshire